The 2017 State of Origin series was the 36th annual best-of-three series between the Queensland and New South Wales rugby league teams. Before this series Queensland had won 20 times, NSW 13 times, with two series drawn. Queensland were the current title holders coming into the series, having won 2-1 in 2016.

With Games One and Two completed, the series was tied with 1 win to each team. Game Three (the Decider) was played in Brisbane at Suncorp Stadium; leading to a 22-6 win to Queensland.

Former Queensland rugby league legend Kevin Walters coached Queensland for the 2nd year after his maiden series win in 2016. Former Canberra, New South Wales and Australia captain Laurie Daley coached New South Wales for the 5th year, looking for his 2nd series win after New South Wales' 2-1 win in 2014.

Queensland won their third consecutive series and their eleventh from the past twelve. New South Wales had decided on an unchanged team throughout the series, for the first time in at least twenty years.

Game I

Game II 

{| width="100%"
| valign="top" width="50%" |

Game III

Player Debuts

Game 1 

  Cap no. 266, Nathan Peats
  Cap no. 267, Jake Trbojevic
  Cap no. 186, Anthony Milford
  Cap no. 187, Dylan Napa

Game 2 

  Cap no. 188, Valentine Holmes
  Cap no. 189, Jarrod Wallace
  Cap no. 190, Coen Hess
  Cap no. 191, Tim Glasby

Game 3 

  Cap no. 192, Cameron Munster
  Cap no. 193, Ben Hunt

Residents

Under 20s

Under 18s

Women's Interstate Challenge

References 

State of Origin series
2017 in Australian rugby league